Gomunice  is a village in Radomsko County, Łódź Voivodeship, in central Poland. It is the seat of the gmina (administrative district) called Gmina Gomunice.

The village has a population of 1,900.

References

Gomunice